Hanunoo may refer to:

 Hanunó'o language, spoken by Mangyans in the Philippines
 Hanunó'o script, used to write the Hanunó'o language.
 Hanunoo (Unicode block)